Ralph Jasper Faudree (August 23, 1939 – January 13, 2015) was a mathematician, a professor of mathematics and the former provost of the University of Memphis.

Faudree was born in Durant, Oklahoma. He did his undergraduate studies at Oklahoma Baptist University, graduating in 1961, and received his Ph.D. in 1964 from Purdue University under the supervision of Eugene Schenkman (1922–1977). Faudree was an instructor at the University of California, Berkeley and an assistant professor at the University of Illinois before joining the Memphis State University faculty as an associate professor in 1971. Memphis State became renamed as the University of Memphis in 1994, and Faudree was appointed as provost in 2001.

Faudree specialized in combinatorics, and specifically in graph theory and Ramsey theory. He published more than 200 mathematical papers on these topics together with such notable mathematicians as Béla Bollobás, Stefan Burr, Paul Erdős, Ron Gould, András Gyárfás, Brendan McKay, Cecil Rousseau, Richard Schelp, Miklós Simonovits, Joel Spencer, and Vera Sós. He was the 2005 recipient of the Euler Medal for his contributions to combinatorics.  His Erdős number was 1: he cowrote 50 joint papers with Paul Erdős beginning in 1976 and was among the three mathematicians who most frequently co-authored with Erdős.

Selected publications

References

External links
Archived version of the professional webpage

1939 births
2015 deaths
20th-century American mathematicians
21st-century American mathematicians
Graph theorists
Oklahoma Baptist University alumni
Purdue University alumni
University of California, Berkeley faculty
University of Illinois faculty
University of Memphis faculty
People from Durant, Oklahoma